William R. Loeffler (born August 9, 1956) is an American professional golfer. 

Loeffler was born in Denver, Colorado. He played college golf at Arizona State University where he won twice and was an All-American in 1977.

Loeffler played on the PGA Tour in 1980 and 1981. His best finish was T-32 at the 1981 Quad Cities Open. He quit professional golf and was reinstated as an amateur by the USGA. He subsequently won the 1986 U.S. Mid-Amateur title and was a member of the winning 1987 Walker Cup team. He turned professional a second time in 1989.

Loeffler was disqualified in his first appearance at a U.S. Senior Open in 2013. He has played in four Senior PGA Championship tournaments, including the 2010 event at Colorado Golf Club in Parker, Colorado where he tied for 56th after going into the final round tied for 30th.

Loeffler was inducted into the Colorado Golf Hall of Fame in 1995.

Loeffler is the currently owner and operator of the Links at Highlands Ranch, a par-62 executive golf course.

Amateur wins
1986 U.S. Mid-Amateur

Professional wins
1991 Colorado Open
1992 PGA Assistant Professional Championship
1993 Colorado Open
2000 Colorado PGA Championship
2002 Colorado PGA Championship
2004 Colorado PGA Championship, Colorado Open
2007 Senior PGA Professional National Championship
2009 Colorado Senior Open

U.S. national team appearances
Amateur
Walker Cup: 1987 (winners)

See also 

 Spring 1981 PGA Tour Qualifying School graduates

References

External links

American male golfers
Arizona State Sun Devils men's golfers
PGA Tour golfers
Golfers from Denver
Sportspeople from Littleton, Colorado
1956 births
Living people